Adam Baldwin (born February 27, 1962) is an American actor. He starred in Full Metal Jacket (1987) as Animal Mother, as well as in the television series Firefly and its continuation film Serenity as Jayne Cobb. His roles include Stillman in Ordinary People (1980), Colonel John Casey in Chuck, and Mike Slattery in The Last Ship.

Early life
Baldwin was born in Winnetka, Illinois, and studied at New Trier Township High School East in Winnetka.

Career
Appearing in a large number of films since 1980, Baldwin rose to prominence as the troubled outcast Ricky Linderman in My Bodyguard (1980) and moved on to bigger roles in D.C. Cab (1983), Full Metal Jacket (1987), Next of Kin (1989), Predator 2 (1990), Deadbolt (1992), Independence Day (1996), The Patriot (2000), and Serenity (2005)—in which he reprises his role as the mercenary Jayne Cobb from the television series Firefly.

His other work includes Radio Flyer (1992), From the Earth to the Moon (1998), The X-Files (Knowle Rohrer), The Cape, Men in Black: The Series, Stargate SG-1, Angel, The Inside, NCIS, and the 2005 remake of The Poseidon Adventure. He also starred in the ABC series Day Break as Chad Shelten in 2006.

Baldwin parodied the Ricky Linderman character in the 2008 film Drillbit Taylor. He is also known for NBC's Chuck, in which he played John Casey, a hard-nosed Marine Colonel working for the N.S.A.

In season four of Castle, Baldwin was reunited with former Firefly castmate Nathan Fillion. He played Detective Ethan Slaughter in the 21st episode called "Headhunters" which aired April 16, 2012. He returned to Castle in season eight, episode six "Cool Boys".

Baldwin won a SyFy Genre Award in 2006 for Best Supporting Actor/Television for his role as Jayne Cobb in the television series Firefly.

Baldwin was cast as Superman in Superman: Doomsday, which is based on DC Comics' The Death of Superman. He also voices the character in the massively multiplayer online game DC Universe Online.

Baldwin has a role as a voice actor in the Xbox 360 games Halo 3 and Halo 3: ODST, the latter putting him in the role of Corporal Taylor "Dutch" Miles.  Baldwin also appears as a voice actor in Half-Life 2: Episode Two for various resistance soldiers and citizens. Along with his Chuck co-star, Yvonne Strahovski, he also appeared in Mass Effect 2, playing the role of Quarian Marine squad leader Kal'Reegar.

Personal life
He has three children with his wife, Ami Julius.

He is a supporter of Ride 2 Recovery, a bike-riding organization set up for the rehabilitation of wounded veterans. He participated in the 2009 "Don't Mess With Texas Challenge" bike ride.

Political views
Politically, he states that he re-examined his liberal views after being given a copy of David Horowitz's book Radical Son. He now considers himself a "small government conservative libertarian", and has contributed to HuffPost.

In late 2015, Baldwin endorsed Ted Cruz for the 2016 United States presidential election via Twitter.

Involvement in Gamergate 
Baldwin has sometimes been credited with originating the hashtag #GamerGate near the end of August 2014 by posting the hashtag on Twitter alongside a pair of videos that, as part of wider criticisms, repeated earlier allegations against Zoë Quinn and Nathan Grayson. He later told an interviewer that "leftists" were imposing "political crap" on gamers.

His role in the Gamergate controversy led to a petition to prevent Baldwin from appearing as a guest at the Supanova Pop Culture Expo in 2015. The convention's management decided to keep Baldwin as a guest.

Filmography

Film

Television

Video games

References

External links

 
 
 
 

1962 births
Living people
American libertarians
American male film actors
American male television actors
American male video game actors
American male voice actors
Gamergaters
Male actors from Chicago
Male critics of feminism
New Trier High School alumni
20th-century American male actors
21st-century American male actors